General elections were held in Malta between 25 and 27 October 1947. They were the first elections held under universal suffrage for women and Agatha Barbara became the first woman elected to Parliament. These elections saw the Labour Party win 24 of the 40 seats.

Electoral system
The elections were held using the single transferable vote system. Property qualifications for voters were abolished, and women were also allowed to vote for the first time. The number of seats was increased from 10 to 40.

Results

References

General elections in Malta
Malta
1947 in Malta
October 1947 events in Europe
1947 elections in the British Empire